The 83rd Infantry Division (83-ya Pekhotnaya Diviziya) was an infantry formation of the Russian Imperial Army.  It was organized at Samara in the Kazan Military District on the basis of hidden hidden frame elements of the 48th Infantry Division.

Organization
1st Brigade
329th Buzuluk Infantry Regiment
330th Zlatoustov Infantry Regiment
2nd Brigade
331st Orsk Infantry Regiment
332nd Oboyansk Infantry Regiment
 Artillery and Sappers
83rd Field Artillery Brigade
 31st Separate Sapper Company

Commanders
July-November 1914: Konstantin Lukich Gilchevsky

References
Deyo, Daniel C., Legions of the East:  A Compendium of the Russian Army in the First World War, Counterintelligence Consulting LLC, 2016

Infantry divisions of the Russian Empire